General elections were held in Lesotho on 24 May 1998, except in the Moyeni constituency, where voting was postponed until 1 August due to the death of one of the candidates. The result was a comprehensive victory for the new Lesotho Congress for Democracy, which claimed 79 of the 80 seats. The party was formed by a breakaway from the Basutoland Congress Party, which had won the 1993 elections.

Of the 1,017,753 registered voters, there were 593,955 valid votes.

Results

References

Lesotho
Elections in Lesotho
1998 in Lesotho
Election and referendum articles with incomplete results